Ilshu-rabi, also Ilšu-rabi ( Il-shu-rabi) was a ruler of Pashime around 2250 BCE. He was a vassal of the Akkadian Empire ruler Manishtushu.

While Ilshu-rabi was in charge of Pashime, another Governor of Manistushu named Eshpum was in charge of Elam, in the city of Susa.

Stele of Ilshu-rabi
A relief of Ilshu-rabi is known, which was discovered in Tell Abu Sheeja, ancient Pashime. The inscription on the stele reads:

Manishtushu Obelisk
The name of Ilšu-rabi as Governor of Pashime also appears in the Manishtushu Obelisk inscription, in several mentions of his son Ipulum, who is said to be:

References

Elamite people
Elamite kings
23rd-century BC rulers